Winston Griffiths may refer to:

Win Griffiths (born 1943), British politician
Winston Griffiths (footballer) (1978–2011), Jamaican soccer player